Anne Nuorgam (born 22 December 1964) is a Finnish Sami politician, member of the Sámi Parliament of Finland since 2000 and current Chair of the United Nations Permanent Forum on Indigenous Issues since 22 April 2019 after being elected in the 18th session.

She has also chaired the Saami Council.

Nuorgam was born in Utsjoki and has a master's degree in Law and is a public law researcher at the University of Lapland, particularly of Sami law. She has two daughters (born in 1987 and 2003).

Anne Nuorgam is a member of the United Nations Permanent Forum on Indigenous Peoples since 10 June 2016 where she represents the Arctic indigenous: the Sami and Inuit.

References

1964 births
Living people
Finnish Sámi people
Finnish Sámi politicians
21st-century Finnish women politicians
Finnish officials of the United Nations
Finnish legal scholars
Sámi activists
Women indigenous leaders